Deraniyagala is a Sinhalese surname.

Notable people
 Ezlynn Deraniyagala (1908–1973), Ceylonese lawyer
 Justin Pieris Deraniyagala (1903–1967), Ceylonese painter
 Lionel Deraniyagala (1940–1994), Sri Lankan actor
 Paulus Edward Pieris Deraniyagala (1900–1976), Ceylonese zoologist
 Siran Upendra Deraniyagala (born 1942), Sri Lankan archaeologist
 Sonali Deraniyagala (born 1964), Sri Lankan economist

See also
 

Sinhalese surnames